P. J. Garvey (1971 – 24 August 2021) was an Irish hurler and Gaelic footballer. At club level he played with Hospital-Herbertstown and Ballybricken-Bohermore and was also a member of the Limerick senior teams as a dual player.

Career
Garvey played the majority of his adult hurling and Gaelic football with the Hospital-Herbertstown club. He first appeared on the inter-county scene during a two-year stint with the Limerick minor team before progressing onto the under-21 side. Garvey played for the Limerick intermediate hurling team as well as the senior team during the 1992-93 National Hurling League. As a Gaelic footballer he lined out with the Limerick senior team that came close to beating Kerry in the 1991 Munster final. Garvey also enjoyed success as manager of the Mungret/St. Paul's club.

Death
Garvey died suddenly on 24 August 2021.

Honours

Mungret/St. Paul's
Limerick Junior A Hurling League: 2021
Limerick City Junior A Hurling League: 2021

References

1971 births
2021 deaths
Dual players
Hospital-Herbertstown hurlers
Limerick inter-county hurlers
Limerick inter-county Gaelic footballers
Hurling managers